Binomio de Oro de América is a Colombian Vallenato group that was founded by lead singer Rafael Orozco and accordionist Israel Romero in the Caribbean Region of Colombia on June 16, 1976. The group grew up in popularity in the 1980s and 1990s and developed mainstream popularity in Venezuela, especially in the city of Maracaibo and in Mexico, mainly in the city of Monterrey.

Early years

The group was officially created by vallenato singer Rafael Orozco and accordionist Israel Romero on June 16, 1976. Both Orozco and Romero were students attending University classes in the city of Barranquilla. Romero had just recorded a Long Play with singer Emilio Oviedo, with strong influences from singer Jorge Oñate, the Lopez brothers, accordionist Colacho Mendoza and the Los Hermanos Zuleta who were the mainstream vallenato groups at the moment. Romero had been successful with the hit songs "Amanecemos Parrandeando" and "Digan lo que digan". Orozco had just recorded the songs "Cariñito de mi vida" by Diomedes Diaz, "Presentimiento" and "Adelante".

The group recorded the long play "Binomio de Oro (album)" in 1977.

After Orozco

After the assassination of Orozco, Romero took the group under his management. He was able to maintain the group's popularity by hiring young talents and maintaining always a new style. Romero first hired Gabriel "El Gaby" García who was physically very similar to Orozco and impersonated him, the chorus was Jean Carlos Centeno and the other was Richard Salcedo, as well as his accordionist nephew JF "El Morre" Romero. Their debut was in Venezuela in a national popular TV show contest "Premio Orquidea" which they won that year. Binomio de Oro then recorded the first album without Orozco titled "Todo Corazón (album)" featuring Romero siting along an empty chair implying that his partner was irreplaceable. The album also featured a song by Rafael Orozco titled "Solo para ti" which became an all time hit.

In 1996 Jean Carlos Centeno and Jorgito Celedon became lead singers of the Binomio de Oro along with Romero as accordionist and his nephew after Garcia's departure. In 1999 singer Jorgito Celedon quit the group to pursue a solo career and was replaced by Junior Santiago. Later Junior Santiago and "Morre" Romero separated from the group to form their own vallenato group.

Discography

From 1977 to 1991 the Binomio de Oro recorded 20 albums not counting special contributions to other artist of the "Fiesta Vallenata" compilations, interrupted with the death of lead singer Rafael Orozco.

1977 - Binomio de Oro (1977 album)
1977 - Por lo Alto
1978 - Enamorado como Siempre
1978 - Los Elegidos (album)
1979 - Super Vallenato
1980 - Clase aparte
1980 - De Cache
1981 - 5 Años de Oro
1982 - Festival Vallenato (album)
1982 - Fuera de Serie (album)
1983 - Mucha Calidad (album)
1984 - Somos Vallenato
1985 - Superior (vallenato album)
1986 - Binomio de Oro (1986 album)
1987 - En Concierto (vallenato album)
1988 - Internacional (vallenato album)
1989 - De Exportación
1990 - De Fiesta con el Binomio
1991 - Por Siempre (vallenato album)
1991 - De América

Singer Gabriel "El Gaby" García replaced Orozco

1993 - Todo Corazón (album)
1994 - De la Mano con el Pueblo
1995 - Lo Nuestro (vallenato album)

Jean Carlos Centeno and Jorgito Celedon became lead singers

1996 - A su Gusto
1997 - Seguimos por lo Alto
1998 - 2000 (vallenato album)

In 1999 singer Jorgito Celedon quits the group, replaced by Junior Santiago.

1999 - Mas Cerca de tí
2000 - Difícil de Igualar
2001 - Haciendo Historia
2003 - Que Viva el Vallenato
2004 - En todo su Esplendor
2005 - Grafiti de Amor
2006 - Impredecible (album)

Awards and nominations

Latin Grammy Awards
A Latin Grammy Award is an accolade by the Latin Academy of Recording Arts & Sciences to recognize outstanding achievement in the music industry. El Binomio de Oro de América has received four nominations..

|-
| 2006 || Grafiti de Amor || Best Cumbia/Vallenato Album || 
|-
| 2007 || Impredecible || Best Cumbia/Vallenato Album || 
|-
| 2010 || Vuelve y pica...El Pollo || Best Cumbia/Vallenato Album || 
|-
| 2011 || Corazón de Miel || Best Cumbia/Vallenato Album || 
|-

References

External links
  Binomio de Oro de America official website
  Binomio de Oro
   Discography

Vallenato musical groups